Aikyō is a family name of Japanese origin that may refer to:

, Japanese former baseball player
, Japanese steeplechase runner

Japanese-language surnames